Morse Dell Plain House and Garden, also known as Woodmar, is a historic home located at 7109 Knickerbocker Parkway in Hammond, Lake County, Indiana.  The house was designed by noted Chicago architect Howard Van Doren Shaw and built in 1923. It is a large two-story, Tudor Revival style brick dwelling with a -story service wing.  The landscape was designed by Jens Jensen in 1926.

It was listed in the National Register of Historic Places in 1998.

See also
National Register of Historic Places listings in Lake County, Indiana

References

Gardens in Indiana
Hammond, Indiana
Houses on the National Register of Historic Places in Indiana
Tudor Revival architecture in Indiana
Houses completed in 1923
Buildings and structures in Lake County, Indiana
National Register of Historic Places in Lake County, Indiana
1923 establishments in Indiana